Zodarion merlijni is a spider species found in Portugal and Spain.

See also 
 List of Zodariidae species

References

External links 

merlijni
Spiders of Europe
Spiders described in 1994